Palooka from Paducah is a 1935 American short comedy film featuring Buster Keaton.

Plot
The struggling Diltz family of farmers decide to set up their own wrestling company as a way to generate money. The father of the family (Joe Keaton) gets his son Jim (Buster Keaton) to help him train his brother Elmer (Robinson) up to be the best wrestler he can be. They hold an open challenge at their first event for anyone to step up and face Dewey, which is answered by established wrestler Bullfrog Kraus (Montana). Before the match, the father appoints Jim as the referee to ensure that Elmer is not seriously hurt. Kraus dominates the fight and hits Jim and his mother (Myra Keaton) out of spite. This makes Elmer angry who is able to make a comeback and sends Kraus crashing through the ring to win the match.

Cast
 Buster Keaton as Jim Diltz
 Joe Keaton as Pa Diltz
 Myra Keaton as Ma Diltz
 Louise Keaton as Sis Diltz
 Dewey Robinson as Elmer Diltz
 Bull Montana as Bullfrog Kraus

See also
 Buster Keaton filmography

External links

 Palooka from Paducah at the International Buster Keaton Society

1935 films
1935 short films
1935 comedy films
American black-and-white films
Films directed by Charles Lamont
American comedy short films
1930s American films